Pounder may refer to:

 Pounder (surname), a surname
Pounder (EP), 2015 Nuclear Assault album 
 Post pounder, a tool used for driving posts into the ground
 Rice pounder, an agricultural tool
 Caliber#Pounds as a measure of cannon bore, a method of rating artillery pieces
 Pounder beer can, a 16 oz can of beer

See also
 James Pounder Whitney (1857–1939), British historian
 Ponder (disambiguation)
 Pound (disambiguation)
 Pounders
 Pounding 
 Pounding (song)